Magas was a Greek Macedonian nobleman that lived in the 4th century BC. His origin is obscure except that he came from region of Eordaea. Little is known on his life. 

Magas married the noblewoman Antigone, the child of Cassander and the niece of the powerful Regent Antipater. His marriage to Antigone reveals that Magas was a nobleman of some social status and influence as he married a close relation to the powerful Regent and his wife was a distant collateral relative to the Argead dynasty. After Magas married Antigone, they settled in Eordaea. Antigone born Magas a daughter; his only known child Berenice I of Egypt. Magas had two namesakes: his grandson Magas of Cyrene and his great, great grandson Magas of Egypt.

Family tree of Magas of Macedon

References

4th-century BC Macedonians
Ptolemaic dynasty